Stanley Myron Bryant (born May 7, 1986) is a Canadian football offensive lineman for the Winnipeg Blue Bombers of the Canadian Football League (CFL). He first enrolled at Elizabeth City State University before transferring to East Carolina University. Bryant attended Goldsboro High School in Goldsboro, North Carolina. He has also been a member of the Denver Broncos and Calgary Stampeders.

Early years
Bryant was a three-year football letterman for the Goldsboro High School Mighty Cougars. He was named the Mighty Cougars defensive player of the year in 2003.

College career

Elizabeth City State University
Bryant played college football for the Elizabeth City State Vikings in 2005.

East Carolina University
Bryant transferred to East Carolina University as a walk-on to play football for the East Carolina Pirates in 2006.

Professional career

Denver Broncos
Bryant was signed by the Denver Broncos on April 27, 2009 after going undrafted in the 2009 NFL Draft. He was released by the Broncos on August 25, 2009.

Calgary Stampeders
Bryant was signed by the Calgary Stampeders on June 16, 2010. He made his CFL debut starting at right tackle on October 22, 2010 against the BC Lions. Bryant was a CFL All-Star and a CFL West All-Star in 2013 and 2014. He was the Stampeders' nominee for the CFL's Most Outstanding Offensive Lineman Award in 2011 and 2013.

Winnipeg Blue Bombers

Bryant was signed by the Winnipeg Blue Bombers on February 10, 2015. In his first two seasons in Winnipeg Bryant started in every game. On January 4, 2016, Bryant and the Bombers agreed to a contract extension. He signed a one-year contract extension with the team on January 5, 2021. On January 5, 2023, at age 36, Bryant and the Bombers agreed to another contract extension.

References

External links

 Winnipeg Blue Bombers bio
 Just Sports Stats
 Calgary Stampeders bio
 NFL Draft Scout

Living people
1986 births
African-American players of American football
African-American players of Canadian football
American football offensive linemen
Calgary Stampeders players
Denver Broncos players
Canadian football offensive linemen
East Carolina Pirates football players
Elizabeth City State Vikings football players
People from Goldsboro, North Carolina
Players of American football from North Carolina
Winnipeg Blue Bombers players
21st-century African-American sportspeople
20th-century African-American people